Abralia fasciolata is a species of enoploteuthid cephalopod that is only known from the Gulf of Aqaba. Mature males can reach a mantle length of 27 mm, with spermatophores 3–3.5 mm in length.

References

Abralia
Molluscs described in 1991